Ceccato was an Italian motorcycle manufacturer founded in 1947 by a former pharmacist, Pietro Ceccato, who was passionate about both engines and innovative management ideas, such as making process changes using input invited from employees.  For the motorcycle Giro d'Italia and other races, Ceccato built the first of Fabio Taglioni's engines to be realized, a 75 cc OHC single designed with the help of Taglioni's Technical Institute students.  The company was active in motorcycles until the 1960s.
It however successfully continued producing compressors and grew over the years. Today Ceccato is an important player on the global compressed air market.

See also 

List of Italian companies
List of motorcycle manufacturers

Notes

External links
 Sheldon's European Motorcycle Universe Ceccato Motorcycles
 Antique motor scooters and classic vintage motorcycles 1952 Ceccato 98cc OHC Corsa Designed by Fabio Taglioni of Ceccato S.p.A., Italy, from 1949 to 1960s
 Official website of Ceccato Compressors

Motorcycle manufacturers of Italy